Dichomeris loxonoma is a moth in the family Gelechiidae. It was described by Edward Meyrick in 1937. It is found in the former Équateur province in the Democratic Republic of the Congo.

The larvae feed on Millettia versicolor.

References

Moths described in 1937
loxonoma